The crimson-backed tanager (Ramphocelus dimidiatus) is a species of bird in the family Thraupidae. It is found in Colombia, Panama, and Venezuela, and introduced to French Polynesia. Its natural habitats are subtropical or tropical moist lowland forests and heavily degraded former forest. A nickname in Panama is sangre de toro ("Blood of the bull").

The crimson-backed tanager was first described by French naturalist Frédéric de Lafresnaye in 1837. It is one of nine species of brightly coloured tanagers of the genus Ramphocelus. Mitochondrial DNA evidence indicates its closest relative is the masked crimson tanager (R. nigrogularis), and the two split around 800,000 years ago.

Its whole head and chest are a maroon red, brightening to a bright red on its lower back and abdomen. Its wings and tail are black. The female is duller with blackish underparts.

It is found in northern and western Colombia (south to Chocó where it is uncommon), the Maracaibo Basin in Venezuela, and over most of Panama, where it extends to Chiriquí and Veraguas Provinces in the west of the country, as well as Coiba, where it is abundant, and Pearl Islands. It inhabits forest, scrub and gardens.

A nest with a clutch of two blue eggs with fine dark dots has been recorded.

A field study on blood parasites found that two individual crimson-backed tanagers (out of twelve tested) bore Plasmodium, with the study concluding the overall rate was low compared with studies done elsewhere.

References

Further reading

External links

 
 
 
 
 
 

crimson-backed tanager
Birds of Panama
Birds of Colombia
Birds of Venezuela
crimson-backed tanager
Taxonomy articles created by Polbot